Edward Dean Adams (April 9, 1846 – May 20, 1931) was an American businessman, banker, power broker and numismatist. He was the president of Niagara Falls Hydraulic Power and Manufacturing Company which built the first hydroelectric power plants in Niagara Falls, New York. The Adams Power Plant Transformer House is named after him. He was "conspicuously successful in corporate reorganizations".
Adams appeared on the cover of Time magazine on May 27, 1929.

He also had wide cultural interests, including numismatics.

Biography
Edward Dean Adams was born in Boston, Massachusetts on April 9, 1846 to businessman Adoniram Judson Adams and Harriet Lincoln Norton. He graduated from Norwich University with a Bachelor of Science in 1864, and attended the Massachusetts Institute of Technology from 1865 to 1866 after spending a year in Europe. Adams joined a Boston stockbroker firm, T.J. Lee & Hill, in 1867, where he worked as a bookkeeper and a cashier. He married Frances Amelia Gutterson in 1872 and had three children. 

In 1878, Adams became a partner for private banking firm Winslow, Lanier & Co. Through the firm, he gained a wide array of positions- including trustee, board member, chairman, and president- of multiple organizations and enterprises, including the Missouri Pacific Railroad Company consolidated mortgage, the Northern Pacific Terminal Company of Oregon, the Edison Illuminating Company, the St. Paul and Northern Pacific Railway Company, the New York, Ontario and Western Railway company, the Central and South American Telegraph Company, All America Cables, Inc., the Central Railroad of New Jersey, the American Cotton Oil Company, the Cataract Construction Company, the International Niagara Commission, and the Niagara Development Company. 

He received the John Fritz Medal in 1926.

Association with the Metropolitan Museum of Art
Adams was a trustee of the Metropolitan Museum of Art for almost 40 years, and served in various capacities. He was a member and treasurer of the special committee for the acquisition of casts and reproductions; chairman of the Finance Committee (1905–1920), and a member of various committees, including the Executive Committee (1910–1931), the Building Committee, the Committee on Educational Work, the Committee on Prints, and the Library Committee.

He also made many gifts to the museum, including a collection of reproductions of the more noteworthy of the bronzes from Herculaneum, in the National Museum at Naples; a collection of photographs of Renaissance architecture and ornament, and of Renaissance and baroque sculpture, medals and many other pieces. He was elected a benefactor of the museum in 1909.

Numismatic interests
Adams was active in the American Numismatic Society, where he was a council member and on many committees involved in publishing the society's medals. He donated Japanese medals to the Metropolitan Museum of Art in 1906.

References

American business executives
1846 births
1931 deaths
John Fritz Medal recipients
American numismatists
Businesspeople from Boston
Burials at Kensico Cemetery